Ozomdel-e Jonubi Rural District is in the Central District of Varzaqan County, East Azerbaijan province, Iran. At the National Census of 2006, its population was 14,203 in 3,074 households. There were 14,184 inhabitants in 3,753 households at the following census of 2011. At the most recent census of 2016, the population of the rural district was 15,851 in 4,917 households. The largest of its 40 villages was Kasin, with 2,780 people.

References 

Varzaqan County

Rural Districts of East Azerbaijan Province

Populated places in East Azerbaijan Province

Populated places in Varzaqan County